The 10th Delaware General Assembly was a meeting of the legislative branch of the state government, consisting of the Delaware Legislative Council and the Delaware House of Assembly. Elections were held the first day of October and terms began on the twentieth day of October. It met in Dover, Delaware, convening October 20, 1785, and was the third year of the administration of President Nicholas Van Dyke, Sr.

The apportionment of seats was permanently assigned to three councilors and seven assemblymen for each of the three counties. Population of the county did not effect the number of delegates.

Leadership

Legislative Council
Thomas McDonough, New Castle County

House of Assembly
Thomas Duff, New Castle County

Members

Legislative Council
Councilors were elected by the public for a three-year term, one third posted each year.

House of Assembly
Assemblymen were elected by the public for a one-year term.

References

Places with more information
Delaware Historical Society; website; 505 North Market Street, Wilmington, Delaware 19801; (302) 655-7161
University of Delaware; Library website; 181 South College Avenue, Newark, Delaware 19717; (302) 831-2965

1 010
1785 in Delaware
1786 in Delaware